Clara Sheller is a French television series created by Nicolas Mercier after the idea of Stéphanie Tchou-Cotta that was aired from 18 May 2005 to 3 December 2008 on France 2. The casting was completely changed between the first and second season, but the characters remained the same. The theme song was written by Mirwais and was called "Naive Song".

In the US, Clara Sheller aired on Eurochannel in 2009. and on TV5Monde.

Cast
 Frédéric Diefenthal as JP
 Thierry Neuvic as Gilles
 Anny Duperey as Danièle
 Charlotte de Turckheim as Marie
 Judith El Zein as Jeanne
 Bruno Salomone as David
 Francine Bergé as Danièle
 Bernard Le Coq as Gilles's Father
 Hélène Vincent as JP's Mother
 Édouard Collin as Brad
 Cyril Descours as Ben

Accolades

References

External links
 Official website of the series
 

2005 French television series debuts
2008 French television series endings
Bisexuality-related television series
French LGBT-related television shows
French comedy-drama television series
2000s French drama television series
2000s French comedy television series
2000s comedy-drama television series